Host is the second studio album by Critters Buggin of Seattle, Washington and was released in 1997.  It was recorded December 18–20 at Bad Animals and December 21–23 live at OK Hotel 1995. Originally released by Loosegroove, Host was reissued by Kufala Recordings in 2004.

Track listing
 "Mount Blasta" - 4:22
 "Mullet Cut" - 5:40
 "Crowley Dissertation" - 0:49
 "Bill Gates 5:52
 "Red Eyed Wonder" - 6:12
 "I Ain't No Adobe Hut" - 3:33
 "Bubble Boy" - 0:59
 "Sheets" - 4:59
 "Manhog's Day in the Park" - 5:50
 "B.H. Goes to a Freak" - 5:07
 "Sex Doily Intro" - 3:45
 "Sex Doily" - 5:08
 "Nahmani" - 1:53
 "Bonus track" - 3:20

Personnel
Matt Chamberlain - drums set, tabla, guitar, lap slide, loops, percussion
Brad Houser - bass, bass clarinet
Skerik - saxophone, piano, rhodes and guitar
Doug Stringer - djembe on "B.H. Goes to a Freak"
Tim Young is Bubble Boy
Doc Britton - the voice of Francis E. Dec on "Bill Gates"

References

1996 albums
Critters Buggin albums